Iciss Tillis (born December 6, 1981) is an American professional women's basketball player. She was born in Tulsa, Oklahoma.

High school
Tillis played for Cascia Prep School in Tulsa, Oklahoma, where she was named a WBCA All-American. She participated in the 2000 WBCA High School All-America Game where she scored five points.

Tillis is the daughter of former Heavyweight boxer James Tillis. James Tillis fought for the Heavyweight championship once and was the first professional boxer to fight Mike Tyson to a decision.

College and professional
Tillis has played in the WNBA with the Detroit Shock, New York Liberty, and Los Angeles Sparks, appearing in 66 games.  She played collegiately for Duke University, where she was named an All-America in 2003 and on the All-ACC first team from 2002 to 2004.  Tillis has also played professionally in Europe.  A scandal erupted in France, where Tarbes Gespe Bigorre attempted to sign Tillis to replace injured star Isabelle Yacoubou despite being over the eligible limit of non-European players imposed by the Ligue Féminine de Basketball. Tarbes was forced to sell Tillis to TTT Riga in Riga, Latvia, where she made the Euroleague's all-star team in 2008.

Duke  statistics
Source

USA Basketball
Tillis was named to the team representing the US at the 2003 Pan American Games. The team lost the opening game to Cuba, then rebounded to win their next five games, including an overtime win against Brazil. They then faced Cuba for the gold medal, falling short 75–64 to take home the silver medal. Tillis averaged 5.0 points per game.

Notes 

1981 births
Living people
All-American college women's basketball players
American women's basketball players
American expatriate basketball people in France
American expatriate basketball people in Latvia
Basketball players at the 2003 Pan American Games
Basketball players from Oklahoma
Detroit Shock players
Duke Blue Devils women's basketball players
Los Angeles Sparks players
New York Liberty players
Sportspeople from Tulsa, Oklahoma
Pan American Games competitors for the United States
United States women's national basketball team players